The following is a list of government-owned airlines. The practice of government ownership of airlines, particularly flag carrier airlines, occurs in many countries. The following is a list of both airlines currently owned by a government, and former government-owned airlines.

Current government-owned airlines

List of former government-owned airlines 
This is a list of airlines which were formerly government owned. They have since been privatized or have ceased operations.

See also 
 Flag carrier
 Government-owned corporation
 List of airlines
 List of government-owned companies

References 

 
Airline-related lists
Airlines